Crotalus aquilus, known as the Querétaro dusky rattlesnake or Queretaran dusky rattlesnake, is a pit viper species found in the highlands of central Mexico. Like all other pit vipers, it is venomous. No subspecies are currently recognized. The specific name, aquilus, is Latin for "eagle" and refers to the high altitude at which this species is found.

Description

Geographic range
They are found in the highlands of central Mexico in Guanajuato, Hidalgo, México, Michoacán, and San Luis Potosí. The type locality given is "near Alvarez, San Luis Potosí, Mexico".

Habitat
These snakes are found in the open grassy and generally rocky habitats north of the Trans-Mexican Volcanic Belt. They also occur in pine-oak forest, open karstic areas, grassy mountain meadows, and stony mesquite-grassland.

Conservation status
This species is classified as Least Concern on the  IUCN Red List (v3.1, 2001). Species are listed as such due to their wide distribution, presumed large population, or because they are unlikely to be declining fast enough to qualify for listing in a more threatened category. The population trend was down when assessed in 2007.

References

Further reading
 Klauber, L.M. 1952. Taxonomic studies on rattlesnakes of Mainland Mexico. Bull. Zool. Soc. San Diego 26: 1–143.

aquilus
Reptiles described in 1952
Endemic reptiles of Mexico